"The Incredible, Edible Egg" is a marketing slogan for the American Egg Board.

It was created in 1976 by the advertising agency Campbell Mithun.

Swann Galleries Saul Mandel Poster Artist 1976 for the Incredible Edible Egg. Swann Galleries is auctioning the original 1976 painting and 1976 Poster on June 5, 2018.

In 2012, after over 20 years, a new version of the jingle aired on radio and television and a video of the jingle sung by the egg farmers and their families was uploaded to YouTube, Facebook and Xbox Live (via advertisements on the U.S. Xbox 360 Dashboard). It was promoted via a contest where Facebook users uploaded their own versions of the new jingle for the chance to win prizes, including an iPad, an iPod Touch 5G with a speaker system and $400 in iTunes Gift Cards, an iPhone 5, an Xbox 360 console with Kinect and a 12-month supply of eggs.

References

External links
IncredibleEgg.org, website by American Egg Board

American advertising slogans
1976 neologisms
Eggs (food)
Advertising campaigns